Felipe Barrientos (born 12 June 1984) is a Chilean handball player for BM Zamora and the Chilean national team.

References

1984 births
Living people
Chilean male handball players
Place of birth missing (living people)
Handball players at the 2003 Pan American Games
Handball players at the 2007 Pan American Games
Handball players at the 2011 Pan American Games
Handball players at the 2015 Pan American Games
Handball players at the 2019 Pan American Games
Pan American Games bronze medalists for Chile
Pan American Games medalists in handball
South American Games bronze medalists for Chile
South American Games medalists in handball
Expatriate handball players
Chilean expatriate sportspeople in Spain
Competitors at the 2018 South American Games
Medalists at the 2015 Pan American Games
Medalists at the 2019 Pan American Games
Medalists at the 2011 Pan American Games
20th-century Chilean people
21st-century Chilean people